The women's heptathlon at the 2013 Southeast Asian Games, the athletics was held in Naypyidaw, Myanmar. The track and field events took place at the Wunna Theikdi Stadiumon December 15–16 .

Schedule
All times are Myanmar Standard Time (UTC+06:30)

Records

Results 
Legend
– — Pass
O — Clearance
X — Failure
DNF — Did not finish
DNS — Did not start

100 metres hurdles 
 Wind: +0.2 m/s

High jump

Shot put

200 metres
 Wind: -0.5 m/s

Long jump

Javelin throw

800 metres

Summary

References

Athletics at the 2013 Southeast Asian Games
2013 in women's athletics